Gayatri Devi was an Indian politician from the state of the Madhya Pradesh. She represented Bijawar Vidhan Sabha constituency of undivided Madhya Pradesh Legislative Assembly by winning General election of 1957.

References 

Year of birth missing
Possibly living people
Madhya Pradesh MLAs 1957–1962
People from Chhatarpur district
Indian National Congress politicians from Madhya Pradesh
20th-century Indian women politicians
20th-century Indian politicians
Women members of the Madhya Pradesh Legislative Assembly